JDS Chihaya (ASR-401) was a submarine rescue ship of Japan Maritime Self-Defense Force.

Development and design 
The Maritime Self-Defense Force did not own a submarine at the time of its inauguration, but in January 1955, it was announced that a submarine would be rented as an addition to the Japan-US Ship Lending Agreement signed in May 1954. The Gato-class submarine USS Mingo was lent by this, and was recommissioned as JDS Kuroshio. The Maritime Self-Defense Force has been researching rescue ships from other countries, conscious of the need for rescue ships that can handle accidents from the time of acquisition of the ship, but the first domestically produced ship JDS Oyashio. The construction of one ship was approved in the 1959 plan when (31SS) was under construction. Chihaya was built due to this.

Construction and career
Chihaya was laid down on 15 March 1960 at Mitsubishi Heavy Industries, Tokyo and launched on 4 October 1960. The vessel was commissioned on 15 March 1961.

On August 1, 1962, the 1st Submarine Corps was newly formed and incorporated under the Kure District Force.

On February 1, 1965, the 1st Submarine Group was newly formed under the Self-Defense Fleet and was incorporated as a ship under direct control.

On 27 March 1985, due to the commissioning of JS Chiyoda, the type was changed to a special service ship, the ship registration number was changed to ASU-7011, and it was transferred to the Kure District Force as a ship under direct control.

She was decommissioned on 28 February 1989.

Gallery

References

1960 ships
Ships built by Mitsubishi Heavy Industries
Auxiliary ships of the Japan Maritime Self-Defense Force
Submarine rescue ships